|}

This is a list of Legislative Council results for the Victorian 1996 state election. 22 of the 44 seats were contested.

Results by province

Ballarat

Central Highlands

Chelsea

Doutta Galla

East Yarra

Eumemmerring

Geelong

Gippsland

Higinbotham

Jika Jika

Koonung

Melbourne

Melbourne North

Melbourne West

Monash

North Eastern

North Western

Silvan

South Eastern

Templestowe

Waverley

Western

By-elections 

There was a Legislative Council by-election that took place on election day following the resignation of MLCs elected at the 1992 election.

Doutta Galla 

This election was caused by the vacancy following the resignation of David White, who unsuccessfully contested the lower house seat of Tullamarine.

See also 

 1996 Victorian state election
 Members of the Victorian Legislative Council, 1996–1999

References 

Results of Victorian state elections
1990s in Victoria (Australia)